Chupungnyeong station is a railway station on the Gyeongbu Line in Yeongdong, South Korea.

Railway stations in North Chungcheong Province